DC2 may refer to:

 Device Control Two, one of the C0 and C1 control codes
 DigiCipher 2, a proprietary standard format of digital signal transmission and encryption
 Douglas DC-2, a 14-seat twin-engined airliner produced by the American company Douglas Aircraft Corporation 1934–1939
 Acura/Honda Integra DC2 chassis
 Dance Central 2, a 2011 video game
 Dino Crisis 2, a 2000 video game

See also
 DCII (disambiguation)